The 2018 Basketball Champions League (BCL) Final Four was the second Basketball Champions League tournament. It was the concluding phase of the 2017–18 Basketball Champions League season.

Venue
The O.A.C.A. Olympic Indoor Hall hosted the final tournament for the first time.

Teams

Road to the Final Four

Background

MHP Riesen Ludwigsburg
Ludwigsburg qualified for its first ever final phase of a European competition, as in the 2016–17 season they were eliminated by Banvit on a buzzer-beater. In the Basketball Bundesliga (BBL), Riesen was having a solid year as it was battling for playoff position. In the BCL play-offs, Riesen eliminated two German sides, EWE Baskets Oldenburg and medi Bayreuth in order to advance to the final four.

Monaco
Monaco was at the top of the standings in its domestic Pro A season. In February, Monaco won the Leaders Cup for its third consecutive time. In the previous season, the team also qualified for the Final Four but was eliminated in the semi-finals, by runners-up Banvit.

AEK Athens
AEK was having a successful season as well, as the team captured its fourth Greek Cup title, while beating EuroLeague teams Olympiacos and Panathinaikos on the way. AEK had a remarkable path to the final four, as it was nearly eliminated in the round of 16 but was saved by a three-pointer by Kevin Punter to defeat Czech side ČEZ Nymburk. In the quarter-finals, AEK eliminated French side SIG Strasbourg. 

Guard Manny Harris was named the Basketball Champions League MVP as well.

UCAM Murcia
In its first BCL season, and just its second year ever playing in European competitions, Murcia eliminated the defending champions Iberostar Tenerife in the round of 16. In the quarter-finals, Pınar Karşıyaka was defeated. In the 2017–18 ACB season, Murcia was close to qualifying to the playoffs.

Bracket

Semifinals

MHP Riesen Ludwigsburg vs Monaco

AEK Athens vs UCAM Murcia

Third place game

Final

References

External links
Basketball Champions League (official website)

Final Four
Basketball Champions League
International sports competitions hosted by Greece
Sports competitions in Athens